Chester Gray Carlisle (November 2, 1916 – August 3, 1988) was an American professional basketball player. He played collegiately for the California Golden Bears. Carlisle played for the Chicago Stags of the Basketball Association of America (BAA) for 51 games during the 1946–47 season.

BAA career statistics

Regular season

Playoffs

External links

1916 births
1988 deaths
Amateur Athletic Union men's basketball players
American men's basketball players
California Golden Bears men's basketball players
Chicago Stags players
Centers (basketball)
Forwards (basketball)